Woody Duh Tyzz-jiun (born 23 October 1959) is a Taiwanese politician, who was the Vice Premier of the Republic of China from 1 February 2016 to 20 May 2016. He was the Governor of Fujian Province. He was the Minister of Economic Affairs (MOEA) of the Republic of China from 10 August 2014 after his predecessor Chang Chia-juch's resignation amid the 2014 Kaohsiung gas explosions. He tendered his resignation from the post on 30 November 2014 after the 2014 Republic of China local election.

Early life
Duh was born in Beijing, and took his bachelor's, master's, and doctoral degrees in forestry at National Taiwan University. In 1993, he did postdoctoral research at the Department of Environmental Resources Engineering, State University of New York College of Environmental Science and Forestry in the United States.

Early career
In his early career, Duh worked as a specialist at the MOEA National Bureau of Standards in 1983–1994, Executive Officer and Section Chief of 5th Directorate of the Executive Yuan in 1994–1997, Senior Technical Specialist of the Industrial Development Bureau (IDB) in 1997, Director of the 6th Division of the IDB in 1997–2001, Chief Secretary of IDB in 2001–2003, Deputy Director-General of the MOEA Small and Medium Enterprise Administration in 2003-2004, and as Chief Secretary of Council for Economic Planning and Development in 2004. He then remained in the MOEA serving as the Director-General of the Department of Commerce in 2004–2006, Counselor in 2006–2007, Director-General of the Department of Industrial Technology in 2007-2009m and Director-General of the IDB in 2009–2012.

Economic Affairs Vice Minister

Chang Chi Foodstuff Factory Co cooking oil scandal
Responding to the scandal regarding the adulteration and mislabeling of cooking oil made by Chang Chi Foodstuff Factory Co. in October 2013, Duh said that although the cooking oil company had obtained the Good Manufacturing Practice (GMD) certificate, the company might give wrong information regarding their manufacturing process to the Industrial Development Bureau. He said that currently the bureau is reviewing the GMD system and might require manufacturers to present its export and import activities and declaration and to allow on-the-spot inspection of their production lines when seeking certification.

References

1959 births
Living people
Republic of China politicians from Beijing
Taiwanese Ministers of Economic Affairs
State University of New York College of Environmental Science and Forestry alumni
National Taiwan University alumni